Thomas Edwin Workman (born November 14, 1944) is an American former professional basketball player. He played in both the NBA and ABA between 1967 and 1971.

During his college career at Seattle University from 1964 to 1967, Workman scored 1,497 points. He holds career averages of 19.2 points and 8.4 rebounds per game in his three seasons. During his sophomore season in 1965–66, Workman played a large role in Seattle upsetting Texas Western, 74–72, as their only loss of a national championship-winning season. He was twice named a First Team All-West Coast Conference player before being selected in the 1967 NBA draft as the eighth overall pick by the St. Louis Hawks.

References

1944 births
Living people
American men's basketball players
Anaheim Amigos draft picks
Baltimore Bullets (1963–1973) players
Basketball players from Seattle
Bishop Blanchet High School alumni
Denver Rockets players
Detroit Pistons players
Los Angeles Stars players
Power forwards (basketball)
Seattle Redhawks men's basketball players
St. Louis Hawks draft picks
St. Louis Hawks players
Utah Stars players